Norton Village Historic District is a national historic district located in the northeast quadrant of Rochester in Monroe County, New York. The district consists of 144 contributing buildings.  The garden apartment complex was originally built in 1949 as part of the Rochester Plan to provide quality, low-rent housing for veterans returning from World War II and their families.  There are 144 two-story garden-style apartment buildings with a total of 288 two-story apartments, or two per building, with the buildings grouped in four main clusters. The buildings are in a vernacular Colonial Revival style. It is one of three complexes built as part of the Rochester Plan; the others are Fernwood Park and Ramona Park.

It was listed on the National Register of Historic Places in 2010.

Gallery

References

External links

Norton Village Recreation Facility

Residential buildings on the National Register of Historic Places in New York (state)
Colonial Revival architecture in New York (state)
Historic districts in Rochester, New York
Historic districts on the National Register of Historic Places in New York (state)
National Register of Historic Places in Rochester, New York